The Spring Garden Tunnel is a railway tunnel located at Spring Garden, California. Chilcoot Tunnel) and crosses under the drainage divide between the East Branch North Fork Feather River (north portal) and the Middle Fork Feather River (south portal).

History
The Western Pacific Railroad (now part of the Union Pacific Railroad) built the tracks along the Feather River in 1909 to complete the Feather River Route, a San Francisco Bay Area to Salt Lake City route competing with the Southern Pacific's route over Donner Pass.

While significantly longer, the Feather River Route was preferred by some over the Donner Pass route (elevation about ) over the Sierra Nevada mountains, because the former's summit under Beckwourth Pass is at a lower elevation (about ) and most of the route follows a gentler grade along the Feather River.

References

Transportation buildings and structures in Plumas County, California
Railroad tunnels in California
Western Pacific Railroad
Union Pacific Railroad tunnels
History of the Sierra Nevada (United States)
Tunnels completed in 1909